Fraita (Berber: ⴼⵕⴰⵢⵟⴰ) is a city in Morocco located  to the southeast of the city of El Kelaa des Sraghna. In the 2014 Moroccan census it recorded a population of 11,298.

El Kelaa des Sraghna
Populated places in El Kelâat Es-Sraghna Province